Otto Didrik Schack, Count of Schackenborg (19 March 1710 – 7 October 1741) was a Danish nobleman and enfeoffed count. He was the third holder of the County of Schackenborg from 1719 to 1741.

Biography 

Otto Didrik Schack was born on 19 March 1710 at Gram Castle in Gram in the Duchy of Schleswig. Born into the noble family of Schack, he was the fifth child and eldest surviving son of the Danish nobleman and civil servant Hans Schack, and his first wife Anna Margrethe Reventlow.

At the early death of his father on 22 September 1719, he inherited the County of Schackenborg and assumed the title of enfeoffed count. Due to his young age, his stepmother dowager countess Anna Sophie Schack assumed the position as county administrator of Schackenborg and became manager of her late husband's estate as guardian of her stepson. In 1725, Count Schack was made a chamberlain at the Danish court, and in 1735 he was appointed assessor. On 27 November the following year, he was awarded the Order of the Dannebrog. 

Count Schack died already on 7 October 1741, aged only 31, in Ballum in the Kingdom of Denmark. He was succeeded by his eldest surviving son, Hans Schack.

Family
Schack married on 11 July 1731 at Seekamp Anna Ernestine Frederikke Vilhelmine Gabel, daughter of Oberberghauptmann Frederik Vilhelm Gabel and Anna Maria Triitzschler, by whom he had six children. She died on 20 March 1748.
 Baroness Anne Margrethe Schack (1733–1733)
 Baroness Anna Sophie Schack (1734–1802)
 Hans Schack, who succeeded him as 4th Count of Schackenborg.
 Count Frederik Christian Schack (1736–1790)
 Baroness Anne Margrethe Schack (1739–1739)
 Baroness Frederikke Anna Sophie Schack (1741–1787)

Notes and references

Bibliography

External links 
 Official website of Schackenborg Castle

1710 births
1741 deaths
18th-century Danish people
People from Tønder Municipality
People from Haderslev Municipality
Knights of the Order of the Dannebrog
Counts of Denmark